Mount Bramhall is a peak of the Walker Mountains, located  east of Mount Hawthorne on Thurston Island. It was first delineated from aerial photographs taken by U.S. Navy Operation Highjump in December 1946, and named by the Advisory Committee on Antarctic Names for Dr. E.H. Bramhall, a physicist of the Byrd Antarctic Expedition in 1933–35.

See also
 Mountains in Antarctica

Maps
 Thurston Island – Jones Mountains. 1:500000 Antarctica Sketch Map. US Geological Survey, 1967.
 Antarctic Digital Database (ADD). Scale 1:250000 topographic map of Antarctica. Scientific Committee on Antarctic Research (SCAR). Since 1993, regularly upgraded and updated.

References 

Mountains of Ellsworth Land